Kolhufushi as a place name may refer to:
 Kolhufushi (Meemu Atoll) (Republic of Maldives)
 Kolhufushi (Noonu Atoll) (Republic of Maldives)
 Kolhufushi (Thaa Atoll) (Republic of Maldives)